Mulpavirales is an order of viruses.

Taxonomy
The following families are assigned to the order:

 Metaxyviridae
 Nanoviridae

References

Virus orders
 Single-stranded DNA viruses